The 2004 Auto Club 500 was a NASCAR Nextel Cup Series stock car race held on May 2, 2004 at California Speedway in Fontana, California. Contested over 250 laps on the 2-mile (3.23 km) asphalt D-shaped oval, it was the tenth race of the 2004 NASCAR Nextel Cup Series season. Rookie Kasey Kahne of Evernham Motorsports won the pole, and Jeff Gordon of Hendrick Motorsports won the race.

Background 
The track's turns are banked from fourteen degrees, while the front stretch, the location of the finish line, is banked at eleven degrees. Unlike the front stretch, the backstraightaway is banked at three degrees.

Qualifying 

*Driver would change to Joe Ruttman for the race.

Results

References

Auto Club 500
Auto Club 500
NASCAR races at Auto Club Speedway